Louis-Napoléon Chaltin (1857–1933) was a Belgian career soldier and colonial official notable for his service in the Congo Free State during the late 19th century.

Career

Chaltin was born in Ixelles in Belgium. He was appointed a lieutenant in 1885 and entered the service of the Congo Free State in 1891. In 1893 he was head of the Force Publique station at Basoko. He left this post to ascend the Lomami River to Bena-Kamba, then striking overland to Riba Riba, near present-day Kindu. Chaltin burned down Riba Riba. When rebuilt, the town took the name of Lokandu. He then raised the siege of the Stanley Falls station; now, Kisangani when it was falling to the Swahilis.  He defeated the Arab-led forces on 18 May 1893. After defeating them again at Kirundu, the Arabs were expelled from the region. On 15 July 1898, the Stanley Falls district would become the Province Orientale, with Stanleyville as its headquarters.

Chaltin secured the Dungu region in the northeast of the free state and was commander of the Haut-Uélé district from 1893.

In 1896, King Leopold II decided to extend the Free State territory to the northeast. His forces were to advance first to the Lado Enclave on the Nile, which had been ceded to him but not yet occupied, and then northward towards Khartoum, capital of the declining Mahdist state of Sudan.

A force of 2,700 men led by Francis, Baron Dhanis was to march by way of the Aruwimi River, while Chaltin was given a force of 700 men to take a more northerly route along the Bomu River. Dhanis's force was mainly made up of Batetela people, who rebelled and killed several Belgian officers, then went on the region's rampage. Dhanis managed to escape, but it was several years before the Batetela revolt was suppressed. Chaltin managed to reach the Nile at Bedden in February 1897 and defeated the Mahdists there in the Battle of Rejaf. This consolidated Leopold's claim to the Upper Nile, but Chaltin did not have the forces to do more.

Chaltin died in Uccle. He gave his name to the town of Port-Chaltin near Kisangani. After independence, the city was renamed Aketi in 1971.

References

Sources

Archive Louis Chaltin, Royal museum for central Africa

1857 births
1933 deaths
People from Ixelles
Belgian Army officers
19th-century Belgian military personnel
20th-century Belgian military personnel
Officers of the Force Publique
Congo Free State officials
Lado Enclave